The Serie B 1971–72 was the fortieth tournament of this competition played in Italy since its creation.

Teams
Genoa, Reggiana and Sorrento had been promoted from Serie C, while Foggia, Lazio and Catania had been relegated from Serie A.

Final classification

Results

References and sources
Almanacco Illustrato del Calcio - La Storia 1898-2004, Panini Edizioni, Modena, September 2005

Serie B seasons
2
Italy